Toy museum may refer to:

 Toy museum
 Toy Museum (Brussels)
 Toy Museum (Melaka)
 The Toy Museum